CBYT was the call sign for the CBC's television transmitter in Corner Brook, Newfoundland and Labrador, Canada, broadcasting on channel 5.  It was carried on cable channel 4 in Corner Brook.

History
CBYT launched as a full-fledged station on June 17, 1959 rebroadcasting the signal from CBHT in Halifax, Nova Scotia until CBNT in St. John's launched in 1964. It was once a semi-satellite of CBNT, carrying a partially separate newscast and producing some programs of its own. However, at its closure, the station was a full rebroadcaster of CBNT, even carrying CBNT's commercials.

In 2002, CBYT ceased to exist as a separately licensed station; its transmitter was assigned to the licence of CBNT.

Due to budget cuts handed down on the CBC in April 2012, the CBC announced several austerity measures to keep the corporation solvent and in operation; this included the closure of the CBC and Radio-Canada's remaining analog transmitters, including CBYT and its transmitters, on July 31, 2012.

Transmitters

References

External links
Canadian Communications Foundation - CBYT History

BYT
Television channels and stations established in 1959
Television channels and stations disestablished in 2012
BYT
Mass media in Corner Brook
BYT